Ali Rafiq (born 5 November 1985) is a Pakistani cricketer. He made his first-class debut for Faisalabad in the 2007–08 Quaid-e-Azam Trophy on 1 November 2007. He was the leading run-scorer for Lahore Whites in the 2018–19 Quaid-e-Azam Trophy, with 421 runs in six matches. In January 2021, he was named in Balochistan's squad for the 2020–21 Pakistan Cup.

References

External links
 

1985 births
Living people
Pakistani cricketers
Balochistan cricketers
Faisalabad cricketers
Lahore Whites cricketers
Water and Power Development Authority cricketers
Place of birth missing (living people)